Avramovo is a village in Ardino Municipality, Kardzhali Province, in southern-central Bulgaria. Until 1934, the settlement had the name Ibrahimler.

References

Villages in Kardzhali Province